Ethnic Business Awards (EBA) are Australian business awards.  The awards recognise the significant achievements of migrant and Indigenous business owners. The EBA’s recognise the contributions made by migrants and the First Australians to business, the economy and multiculturalism. They reward their central roles in making Australia a welcoming, tolerant and fair society.

They were founded in 1988 by Joseph Assaf AO, a Lebanese born Australian who specializes in multicultural marketing and businesses.

Categories
The Ethnic Business Awards consist of the following three categories:
Small Business (with turnover of less than or equal to $10 million per annum)
Medium to Large Business (with turnover of greater than $10 million per annum)
Indigenous in Business

References

External links
 Official Homepage of the Awards
 Official Youtube Page of the Awards

Business and industry awards